The Callery River is a river of New Zealand. It lies mostly within Westland Tai Poutini National Park, and is a tributary of the Waiho River. The Callery flows west from the Callery Saddle for  before turning north to reach the Waiho close to Franz Josef township.

See also
List of rivers of New Zealand

References
Land Information New Zealand - Search for Place Names

Rivers of the West Coast, New Zealand
Westland District
Westland Tai Poutini National Park
Rivers of New Zealand